Tochovice is a municipality and village in Příbram District in the Central Bohemian Region of the Czech Republic. It has about 600 inhabitants.

Administrative parts
The village of Hořejany is an administrative part of Tochovice.

Geography
It lies in the Benešov Uplands. There are several ponds in the municipal territory, the largest of them is Zákostelecký.

History
The first written mention of Tochovice is from 1305, when King Wenceslaus II donated the village to the Ostrov Monastery in Davle.

Sport
There is a racecourse for horse racing in Tochovice.

Sights
The landmark of Tochovice is the Tochovice Castle. It was originally a Renaissance fortress, rebuilt into the late Baroque castle. The castle was then extended and rebuilt in the early Neoclassical style in 1821–1823. The castle is surrounded by a park.

References

External links

Villages in Příbram District